Dumas (original title: L'Autre Dumas) is a 2010 French film directed by Safy Nebbou about 19th-century French author Alexandre Dumas.

Plot
In February 1848, Alexandre Dumas (Gérard Depardieu) is at the height of his fame. He has withdrawn for a few days into the immense Château de Monte-Cristo near Le Port-Marly, that he is building. There he works with his collaborator, Auguste Maquet (Benoît Poelvoorde). If the books bear Dumas' name, the tiring work undertaken by Maquet is colossal. Nevertheless, for ten years, Maquet has remained in the great man's shadow and never challenged his supremacy. When a quarrel breaks out between the two men, after Maquet passes himself off as Dumas in order to seduce Charlotte (Mélanie Thierry), a crucial question presents itself: what is the exact part each man has in the work's success? Who is the father  of d'Artagnan, and of Monte Cristo? In short, who is really the author?  Their formerly peaceful relationship is now in doubt and topples over into confrontation. And not far away, in Paris, a revolution is building which will seal the fate of another relationship—that of Louis-Philippe— with the people of France.

Cast
 Gérard Depardieu – Alexandre Dumas
 Benoît Poelvoorde – Auguste Maquet
 Dominique Blanc – Céleste Scriwaneck
 Mélanie Thierry – Charlotte Desrives
 Catherine Mouchet – Caroline Maquet
 Jean-Christophe Bouvet – M. Bocquin
 Philippe Magnan – Guizot
 Florence Pernel – Ida Ferrier Dumas
 Michel Duchaussoy – Sub-prefect Crémieux
 Roger Dumas – M. de Saint Omer
 Ophélia Kolb – Marion
 Christian Abart – Inspector Flanchet
 Alexis Michalik – Jean-Baptiste Béraud

Reception

The Council of Black Associations of France criticized the decision to cast the white actor Gérard Depardieu to play the part of Dumas, who "was the grandson of a Haitian slave and often referred to himself as a negro".

References

External links
 

2010 films
2010s French-language films
Alexandre Dumas
Films set in 1848
French biographical films
Films about writers
Films directed by Safy Nebbou
2010s French films